The Campaign of the Main (in German: Mainfeldzug) was a campaign of the Prussian army in the area of the river Main against the allies of Austria in Southern Germany during the Austro-Prussian War of 1866.

Preliminary campaign
While the greater part of the Prussian troops marched to Bohemia, where they defeated the Austrian and Saxon troops on 3 July 1866 at Königgrätz (Sadova), another part of the Prussian troops invaded the Kingdom of Hanover. After the surrender of Hanover on June 29 these troops - including some small units of allies of Prussia - were grouped under the name Mainarmee (German for: Army of the Main) and pushed southward towards the river Main against the South-German allies of Austria.

Course
The allies of Austria had formed the VIIth and VIIIth Federal Corps of the German Confederation. Both corps had advanced northward to support Hanover. When Hanover surprisingly surrendered the VIIth Corps, built by the Bavarians, stood in Thuringia. The VIIIth Corps, built by troops of Hesse, Baden and Wuerttemberg, stood north of Frankfurt. At first the Prussians attacked the VIIth Corps. The Bavarian troops lost combats at Hünfeld and Dermbach on 4 July and withdrew to the river Franconian Saale. But the Prussians followed quickly across the mountains of the Rhön and beat the Bavarians in the battle of Kissingen and Hammelburg on 10 July.

Now the Bavarians retreated to Würzburg while the Prussians turned westward against the VIIIth Corps which protected Frankfurt. The Prussians crossed the Spessart, defeated the Hessians at Laufach/Frohnhofen on 13 July and the Austrian and Hessian troops at Aschaffenburg on 14 July. The Federal troops had to withdraw westward to the left bank of the Main. After the Prussians had conquered Aschaffenburg and crossed the Main the way to Frankfurt and Darmstadt was open. Now the VIIIth Corps abandoned Frankfurt, moved south across the Odenwald and then turned eastward to meet the Bavarians at the river Tauber. The Prussians occupied the now undefended Frankfurt on 16 July and then followed the VIIIth Corps along the left bank of the Main. In the combat of Hundheim (23 July), the battles of Werbach, Tauberbischofsheim (both 24 July) and Gerchsheim (25 July) the VIIIth Corps was defeated by the Prussians. At 25 July the Prussians also clashed with the Bavarians again at Helmstadt and the following day at Rossbrunn. This combats were also won by the Prussians. The allied troops retreated to Würzburg. The Prussians followed and began to bombard the fortress of Würzburg on 26 July. But soon a truce was negotiated after the news had reached the Bavarian headquarters, that the Prussians and the Austrians had signed their Armistice of Nikolsburg at the same day. At last Würzburg was occupied by the Prussians.

In a separate operation the 2nd Prussian reserve corps marched into Bavaria at the north-east on 23 July and occupied Hof, Bayreuth (28 July) and at last Nuremberg (31 July).

Reasons for the Prussian victory
The Prussian victory is more the result of better organization than of the technical superiority of the Prussian weapons like the needle gun (Zündnadelgewehr). Helmut von Moltke, the chief of the Prussian general staff, had planned an offensive war to beat the  federal troops before they could unite and fully use their superiority in men and equipment. The plan was successful because the untrained federal armies needed a long time for mobilization which the Prussians had prepared well. Furthermore the Prussians had one unified command which the federal side had not. Formally Karl von Bayern, the commander of the VIIth corps, was supreme commander of all the federal troops, but Alexander von Hessen, the chief of the VIIIth corps, also received orders from the Federal Convention (Bundestag) in Frankfurt and the governments of the states which had sent troops. The communication between the federal troops was as insufficient as their reconnaissance so that they often had to react instead of acting initiatively.

Consequences
The German Confederation was abolished. Prussia annexed Hannover, Nassau, Hesse-Kassel and Frankfurt and small parts of Hesse-Darmstadt and Bavaria. Bavaria, Württemberg, Baden and Hesse-Darmstadt remained independent, but had to sign military alliances with Prussia. In Bavaria a fundamental army reform followed in 1868.

References 

Battles involving Bavaria
Battles involving Prussia
Battles of the Austro-Prussian War
Battles involving Austria
Campaign of the Main
Campaign of the Main